Walang Hanggang Paalam (International title: Irreplaceable / ) is a Philippine television drama action series broadcast by Kapamilya Channel. It premiered on the network's Primetime Bida evening line up from September 28, 2020, to April 16, 2021, replacing A Soldier's Heart.

Series overview

 iWantTFC shows two episodes first in advance before it broadcasts on TV.

Episodes

Season 1

References

Lists of Philippine drama television series episodes